Takht-e-Nasrati is a town of  Karak District in Khyber Pakhtunkhwa. The town is the headquarters of Takht-e-Nasrati Tehsil - an administrative subdivision of the district, as well as a Union Council of the tehsil.

Educational Institutes 
 Govt Degree College Takht-e-Nasruti Karak
 Govt Girls Degree College Takht-e-Nasruti Karak

References

Populated places in Karak District
Karak District